Robert "Bob" Morrison (1926–2016) was an association football player who represented New Zealand at international level.

Morrison made his full All Whites debut, a 0–2 loss to New Caledonia on 19 September 1951 and ended his international playing career with 10 A-international caps to his credit, his final cap an appearance in a 5–3 win over Tahiti on 28 September 1952.

References 

New Zealand association footballers
New Zealand international footballers

Association footballers not categorized by position

1926 births

2016 deaths